Modinagar railway station (code: MDNR) is a main railway station in Ghaziabad district, Uttar Pradesh. It serves Modinagar city. The station consists of two platforms. The platforms are not well sheltered. It lacks many facilities including water and sanitation.

The station lies between Meerut and Ghaziabad therefore most of the major express trains as well as all general passenger trains from Delhi to Meerut–Haridwar–Dehradun route stop at this railway station. The station is part of Delhi–Meerut–Saharanpur line of the Northern Railway and comes under Delhi railway division of Northern Railway.

Trains 

Some of the trains that run from Modinagar are:

 Chhattisgarh Express
 Panchvalley Passenger
 Ambala–Hazrat Nizamuddin Passenger
 Indore–Dehradun Express
 Jalandhar City–New Delhi Intercity Express
 Shalimar Express
 Old Delhi–Saharanpur DEMU Passenger
 Meerut City–Anand Vihar MEMU
 Rishikesh–Old Delhi Passenger
 Saharanpur Delhi Passenger
 Meerut Cantt.–Rewari Passenger
 Delhi–Ambala Cantonment Intercity Express
 Kalka Delhi Passenger
 Yoga Express
 Meerut City–Mandsor Link Express
 Bandra Terminus–Dehradun Express
 Uttranchal Express

References

Railway stations in Ghaziabad district, India
Lucknow NR railway division
Modinagar